Rajendra Prasad Gupta is an Indian politician and current member of the Bihar Legislative Council from the Bharatiya Janata Party. He was nominated as the member by the Governor of Bihar in March 2021.

References

Living people
1959 births
Bharatiya Janata Party politicians from Bihar
Members of the Bihar Legislative Council